Crassispira brujae is a species of sea snail, a marine gastropod mollusk in the family Pseudomelatomidae.

Description
The length of the shell attains 30 mm.

Distribution
This marine species occurs in the southern part of the Sea of Cortez, Western Mexico

References

 Hertlein, L. G. and A. M. Strong. 1951. Eastern Pacific expeditions of the New York Zoological Society. XLIII. Mollusks from the west coast of Mexico and Central America. Part X. New York Zoological Society, Zoologica 36(2): 66 120, 11 pls.

External links
 Biolib.cz: Crassispira brujae
 
 

brujae
Gastropods described in 1951